Sleeping Beauty is a 1959 American animated musical fantasy film produced by Walt Disney Productions and released by Buena Vista Distribution. Based on Charles Perrault's 1697 fairy tale of the same title, it is the 16th Disney animated feature film. Clyde Geronimi was the supervising director, while Wolfgang Reitherman, Eric Larson, and Les Clark directed the film's individual sequences. Featuring the voices of Mary Costa, Bill Shirley, Eleanor Audley, Verna Felton, Barbara Luddy, Barbara Jo Allen, Taylor Holmes, and Bill Thompson, the film's plot follows a young princess Aurora, who was cursed by the evil fairy Maleficent to die from a prick on a spindle of the spinning wheel, but was saved by the three good fairies, who altered the curse so that the princess instead fell into a deep sleep to be awakened by true love's kiss.

Walt Disney first considered making Sleeping Beauty in the late 1930s, but it was not placed into production until the early 1950s. It took nearly a decade and $6 million to produce the film, which made it the most expensive Disney animated feature at that time. The film's tapestry-esque design was developed by Eyvind Earle, who drew inspiration from the pre-Renaissance European art, while its musical score and songs, composed by George Bruns, were based on the 1889 The Sleeping Beauty ballet by Pyotr Tchaikovsky. Sleeping Beauty was the first animated film to be photographed in the Super Technirama 70 widescreen process, as well as the second full-length animated feature to be filmed in anamorphic widescreen, following Lady and the Tramp (1955). It was also the last hand-inked Disney full-length animated film before the studio switched to the Xerox process, starting with One Hundred and One Dalmatians (1961).

Sleeping Beauty was released to theaters on January 29, 1959, to mixed reviews from critics, who praised its art direction and musical score, but criticized the plot and characters. In its initial release, the film grossed $5.3 million against its $6 million budget, making it a box-office bomb and causing Disney to lose interest in the animation medium. However, the film's subsequent re-releases proved very successful, and it has since become one of the most artistically acclaimed Disney features ever produced. It was also nominated for the Academy Award for Best Scoring of a Musical Picture at the 32nd Academy Awards.

A live-action reimagining of the film was released in 2014, followed by a sequel in 2019. That same year, the film was selected for preservation in the United States National Film Registry by the Library of Congress as being "culturally, historically, or aesthetically significant".

Plot 
After several years of having no children, the rulers of a European kingdom, King Stefan and Queen Leah welcome the birth of their daughter, Princess Aurora. They proclaim a holiday for their subjects to pay homage to the princess, and at her christening she is betrothed to Prince Phillip, the son of King Stefan's friend King Hubert, to unite their kingdoms.

Among the guests are the three good fairies, Flora, Fauna and Merryweather. Flora and Fauna bless Aurora with beauty and song, respectively, but Merryweather's gift is interrupted by the arrival of an evil fairy Maleficent. As revenge for not being invited, she curses Aurora, proclaiming that the princess will grow in grace and beauty, but before the sun sets on her sixteenth birthday, she will prick her finger on the spindle of a spinning wheel and die. Since her magic is no stronger than Maleficent's to undo the curse, Merryweather uses her blessing to weaken the curse so that instead of dying, Aurora will fall into a deep sleep, only broken by true love's kiss. King Stefan orders all spinning wheels throughout the kingdom be burned. At the fairies' urging, King Stefan and Queen Leah reluctantly take Aurora to a cottage in the forest to live with the fairies in safety.

Sixteen years later, Aurora, renamed Briar Rose, grows into a beautiful young woman. On her sixteenth birthday, the fairies ask her to gather berries while they prepare a surprise party. Aurora befriends the animals of the forest and sings them a song, "Once Upon a Dream". Phillip, now a handsome young man, follows Aurora's voice and is instantly struck by her beauty. She is initially frightened, as she is not allowed to talk to strangers, but she and Phillip fall in love, and she invites him to meet her family at the cottage that night.

Meanwhile, Flora and Merryweather argue over the color of Aurora's gown, attracting the attention of Maleficent's raven, Diablo, who learns Aurora's location. Returning home, Aurora is thrilled to tell her guardians that she has fallen in love. The fairies finally tell Aurora that she is a princess, already betrothed to a prince, and she must never see the man she met again. Heartbroken, Aurora cries in her room. Phillip tells his father of the peasant girl he met and wishes to marry, in spite of his prearranged marriage. King Hubert fails to convince his son otherwise, leaving him devastated.

The fairies take Aurora to the castle to await her birthday celebrations, where she will finally see her parents. Maleficent appears and lures Aurora to a dark tower room away from the fairies, where she lures Aurora to prick her finger on a spinning wheel's spindle, fulfilling the curse. The three fairies place the now-sleeping Aurora on a bed in the highest tower and place a powerful spell on all the people in the kingdom, causing them to sleep until the spell on their princess is broken. They overhear a sleepy conversation between the two kings, and realize that Phillip is the man with whom Aurora has fallen in love. They rush to find him, but he is abducted by Maleficent and her minions at the cottage. She reveals to Phillip the enchanted princess and her plan to lock him away for a century until he is on the verge of death, then release him to meet his love, who will not have aged a single day.

The fairies rescue Phillip, arming him with the magical Sword of Truth and the Shield of Virtue. An enraged Maleficent surrounds the castle with thorns but fails to stop Phillip. She teleports in front of him and transforms into a gigantic dragon. They battle, and Phillip throws the sword, blessed by the fairies, directly into Maleficent's heart, causing her to fall to her death.

Phillip awakens Aurora with a kiss, breaking the spell and waking the kingdom. The royal couple descends to the ballroom, where Aurora is reunited with her parents. Flora and Merryweather continue their argument over Aurora's gown while the happy couple dances, living happily ever after.

Cast 

 Mary Costa as Princess Aurora, also known as Briar Rose, a dreamy and romantic daughter of King Stefan and Queen Leah, who falls victim of Maleficent's curse. Walt Disney spent three years looking for the "ideal ethereal" voice for the character and considered shelving the project, until Costa was cast in 1952. She got to the audition because of Walter Schumann, who heard Costa's singing at a dinner party for the entertainment industry and invited her to come to the studio to audition the following morning. Since she was from Knoxville, Tennessee, Costa had a strong southern accent, which nearly prevented her from being cast until she proved that she could sustain a fake British accent. Within hours of her audition, Disney personally contacted Costa to confirm that she had been cast, and subsequently regularly communicated with her at least twice a week for nine months, giving advice or guidance, but exclusively via telephone, since he did not want Costa's personality or appearance to influence his vision of the character. Prior to Costa's casting, several LP records from forty female singers were heard by the story artists, and fifteen from among them auditioned at the studio. Costa's recording sessions lasted for three years, from 1952 to 1955.
 Bill Shirley as Prince Phillip, King Hubert's laid-back yet courageous son and Aurora's "true love", to whom she was betrothed. He is occasionally accompanied by his pet horse, Samson. Twenty male singers auditioned for the part, and Shirley, who had a high baritone and experience in light opera, was the final choice. Before he and Costa were selected, both made audition records together to determine if their voices complimented each other. After hearing the records, Disney was convinced they did and approved of the casting.
 Eleanor Audley as Maleficent, a powerful dark fairy and self-proclaimed "Mistress of All Evil" who casts a deadly curse on Aurora. She is frequently accompanied by her pet raven, Diablo. Audley, who had previously voiced Lady Tremaine in Cinderella (1950), was personally suggested for the role by Disney. Audley initially turned it down, since she was battling tuberculosis at the time and wasn't sure she would be up to recording sessions, but reconsidered as she started feeling better. Later, speaking of her voice work for the character, Audley stated that she "tried to do a lot of contrasting to be both sweet and nasty at the same time". She also provided a live-action reference for  the character.
 Verna Felton as Flora, Aurora's bossy and headstrong fairy godmother and guardian, who serves as the leader of the Three Good Fairies. Her signature color is red. An early character outline described her as "the matriarch type, large and dominating… talks with a great deal of authority, is the practical one of the Good Fairies—the 'Doc' type". Disney personally chose Felton, who had previously voiced similar characters in Dumbo (1941), Cinderella (1950) and Alice in Wonderland (1951).
 Barbara Luddy as Merryweather, Aurora's feisty and short-tempered fairy godmother and guardian, who tends to challenge Flora's leadership. Her signature color is blue. According to a Disney Publicity synopsis from the film's original release, Merryweather was supposed to bless Aurora with the gift of happiness, until she had to use it to weaken Maleficent's curse.
 Barbara Jo Allen as Fauna, Aurora's gentle and a bit flighty fairy godmother and guardian, who tends to act as a peacemaker between Flora and Merryweather. Her signature color is green. Described as "a little bit nitwitted… jumps at conclusions and goes off on the wrong track… not quite with it", the character was frequently compared to Vera Vague from The Bob Hope Show by the story artists, which led to the casting of Jo Allen.
 Taylor Holmes as King Stefan, Aurora's regal and soft-spoken father and Queen Leah's husband. Many actors were auditioned for the part, until Holmes was cast due to his "bemused, but dignified" voice. Sleeping Beauty marks the final performance of Holmes, who died eight months after film's release.
 Bill Thompson as King Hubert, Phillip's jolly and loud father and Stefan's lifelong friend. The character outline described him as "built like Bill Thompson, fat and square… loveable but hot-tempered… gets in his own trap then explodes… sincere", which led to the casting of Thompson, who had previously voiced the White Rabbit in Alice in Wonderland (1951) and Mr. Smee in Peter Pan (1953).
 Candy Candido, Pinto Colvig and Bob Amsberry as the Goons, Maleficent's bumbling yet menacing henchmen.
 Dallas McKennon as the Owl, one of Aurora's animal friends.
 Marvin Miller as the Narrator.

Production 
Walt Disney first considered making an animated adaptation of Charles Perrault's fairy tale "Sleeping Beauty" in 1938. Preliminary artwork was submitted by Joe Grant, but the project did not move forward. In November 1950, Disney officially announced that he was developing Sleeping Beauty as an animated feature film, although the production title was registered months earlier, on January 19, 1950, due to a preview audience's positive reaction to Cinderella (1950). Disney envisioned Sleeping Beauty as his masterpiece and the ultimate in animated filmmaking, and was willing to pour all the necessary resources to achieve that. He also realized the difficulty of producing another fairy tale feature that would not be too derivative of his previous films, particularly, Snow White and the Seven Dwarfs (1937) and Cinderella (1950), and over the course of the film's production kept reiterating to his staff that it had to be different.

Story development 
Key early story work on Sleeping Beauty was done by Ted Sears, Winston Hibler and Bill Peet, who were joined by other story artists as the film's production progressed. They decided to discard the "bizarre" second half of the Perrault's story, which tells about the life of a sleeping beauty married to a strange prince, and instead focus on its first half, ensuring the development of a more convincing romantic relationship between the characters. The earliest known story outline was written in April 1951, featuring a wake-up kiss as a climactic moment and the encounter between the prince and princess before the latter succumbs to the curse. It also indicated the names of the fairies, whose number had been reduced from eight to four, and their corresponding magical abilities—Tranquility, the Fairy of Dreams; Fernadell, the Fairy of the Forest; Merryweather, the Fairy of the Elements; and Maleficent, the Fairy of Darkness. Their roles in the story were also significantly expanded, with the good fairies being turned into comical companions and guardians of the princess, while the evil fairy became the primary source of conflict in the story and was built up as a more powerful villain than her hag-like counterpart from the original tale.

In this version of the story, Maleficent was to conjure an indestructible spinning wheel, which the king and queen would have unsuccessfully tried to get rid of until they would have been forced to hide their daughter in the castle walls and never let her out. The princess herself was envisioned as a "poor little rich girl", burdened by her royal pedigree and dreaming of exploring the world outside the castle, similarly to Jasmine from Aladdin (1992) over 40 years later. Shortly before her sixteenth birthday, the princess was to switch clothes with her maidservant and secretly escape to a nearby forest or, as in one of the later variations of the story treatment, to a country fair, where she would have met and fell in love with the prince. Then, he was to go on a journey to a faraway land and return a few years later to fight Maleficent with the help of the good fairies, find the sleeping princess and wake her up with the kiss. Several story ideas of that period also included the good fairies attempting to surround the castle with a protective circle and Maleficent's comically incompetent vulture sidekick, although the earlier outline depicted him as a sinister huge falcon.

In June 1952, the full storyboard presentation was completed, but Disney rejected it, concluding that this story approach was too similar to the studio's earlier films. Because of this, the story team threw out the original version and worked from scratch while deciding to retain several story points from earlier suggestions. These included the prince's acquaintance with the princess before the curse is fulfilled, and, consequently, a shorter duration of her sleep, which lasted a hundred years in the original fairy tale. Initially, the story artists worked out an elaborate sequence in which the characters would have met during a treasure hunt, but it was eventually abandoned when it became too drawn out and drifted from the central storyline. Instead, it was written that prince and princess would meet in the forest by random chance, which had previously been introduced in the 1951 outline.

Part of the difficulty was trying to differentiate Disney's third princess, who was named Aurora, from Snow White and Cinderella. To do that, the story artists came up with an idea to have the fairies rear her up in a forest cottage, with Aurora being completely unaware of her background or the danger she was in. She also was given a different personality style—"a freshness and a modern sensibility" to make her more appealing to the audiences. Also, Disney, prompted by the improvement of his animators' skills in draftsmanship of a realistic male figure, insisted on expanding the role of the prince, who was named Phillip. Particularly, to further establish him as Aurora's "true love", the story artists developed a storyline in which Maleficent kidnaps Phillip and plots to keep him prisoner in her castle for a century, referring to the centennial slumber from the original fairy tale.

Striving for a more serious direction of storytelling, Disney personally cut out several gags and comic scenes for the Three Good Fairies, which he felt were too "slapsticky" and more appropriate for Donald Duck shorts. One of these was a sequence in which the fairies, who by that time had been renamed Flora, Fauna, and Merryweather, attempt to bake a birthday cake for Aurora, but end up accidentally blowing up the oven. Also, the characters were originally supposed to rule over the domains, indicated by their names—Flora was to have charge of flowers and plants, Fauna was to oversee the animals and birds, and Merryweather was to control the climate. Disney ultimately discarded this idea as well, feeling that it led the main plot nowhere.

Among other things, earlier versions of the story suggested Aurora to directly encounter with Maleficent, who would have tricked her into pricking the finger on the spindle. However, Disney felt that the "eerie, haunting presentation of a victim powerless in the hands of evil" would be the "strongest and best statement for the film", so the scene was rewritten to have Maleficent lure Aurora with hypnosis. Several story elements originated from discarded ideas for Snow White and the Seven Dwarfs (1937) and Cinderella (1950), including Maleficent's capture of Phillip and his escape from her domain, as well as Disney's favorite concept—prince and princess dancing on a cloud. In all, more story sessions were held on Sleeping Beauty than on any previous Disney animated production.

Production delays 
By mid-1952, Disney had planned to release Sleeping Beauty on Christmas 1955. However, production did not start until July 1953, when Wilfred Jackson, who was assigned as the film's supervising director, recorded the dialogue, assembled a story reel, and was to commence preliminary animation work for a pilot sequence, in which Aurora and Phillip were to meet in the forest and dance. In the following few months, the sequence underwent extensive rewriting due to a "lukewarm" response from Disney. In December 1953, Jackson suffered a heart attack and was replaced by Eric Larson, whose unit would animate the forest sequence. As early as 1954, the project was still in the early stages of production.

By April 1954, Sleeping Beauty was scheduled for a February 1957 release, but it was subsequently postponed to Christmas 1957. Later that same year, Disney began constructing the Disneyland theme park and developing a number of television series, including Disneyland and The Mickey Mouse Club. Most of the studio personnel, who were working on Sleeping Beauty at that time, were assigned to develop those projects, and the film's production was temporarily suspended. During its dormancy, the project was handed to Erdman Penner and Joe Rinaldi for further development, while the castle built at Disneyland was specifically named Sleeping Beauty Castle to promote the film.

Production of Sleeping Beauty resumed in December 1956, and by that time the release date was scheduled for Christmas 1958. Disney insisted on personally overseeing every aspect of the film or otherwise "he wouldn't accept it", but still remained very focused on Disneyland. Milt Kahl would blame him for the numerous delays because "he wouldn't have story meetings. He wouldn't get the damn thing moving". According to studio executive Harry Tytle, after a screening of the finished footage in August 1957, Disney also expressed the disinterest in the project, "seemed to be tired, had so much on his mind. He didn’t give this the treatment he would have in years past, where he’d go in for a couple of days and fine-tooth comb the whole picture… His comments were general rather than specific."

Constant production delays led to a significant increase in its costs. In particular, the cost of the forest sequence, which took several years to complete, amounted to $10,000, exceeding the budget, which Disney was dissatisfied with. Relatively late in production, he removed Larson as supervising director and replaced him with Clyde Geronimi. Also, to keep costs down, a quota system was instituted at the studio, due to which animators had to create a certain number of animation drawings per day.

Animation

Art direction 
To distinguish Sleeping Beauty from his previous features, Disney decided to take a different approach to the film's art direction, utilizing a more unique and distinctive visual design. Around December 1952, Kay Nielsen, whose sketches were the basis for the Night on Bald Mountain segment in Fantasia (1940), returned to the Disney studio and was the first to create styling sketches for the film that suggested an "ethereal depiction of the Middle Ages". While impressed with his artwork, Ken Anderson, who was assigned as the film's production designer, felt that Nielsen's soft pastel paintings would be difficult to translate into animation. Disney then tasked John Hench to help interpret Nielsen's artwork by using opaque cel paint, but, as early as April 1953, Nielsen left the studio again.

The tapestry-esque style of the film originated after Hench's visit to the Cloisters of Metropolitan Museum of Art in New York City, where he observed the Unicorn Tapestries series. Upon his return to the studio, Hench brought reproductions of the tapestries to Disney, suggesting them as a visual template for Sleeping Beauty, which Disney approved. Then, Hench made some sketches that were inspired by the museum trip, and the background artist Eyvind Earle made first trial paintings based on those drawings. When a few of them were done, Disney held a meeting at which he said "Okay. That’s it. Everybody will follow Eyvind." After one of the story meetings, Disney also told Eric Larson that he needed a "moving illustration", adding that he didn't care how long it takes, as long as it ended up on the screen.

Wanting Sleeping Beauty to have a unified look from beginning to end, Disney assigned Earle as both the film's color stylist and artistic director, giving him control over the film’s entire visual appearance, which had never been done at the studio before. Earle's style was influenced by the pre-Renaissance Northern European art, such as the works of Pieter Bruegel, Albrecht Dürer, Huybrecht van Eyck, Giotto di Bondone, and Sandro Botticelli, as well as by Gothic and Persian art, medieval tapestries, and Japanese prints. For Sleeping Beauty, his main inspiration was the French illuminated manuscript of Herman and Jean Limbourg, Très Riches Heures du Duc de Berry, from which he took the key colors for the film, such as the yellow-green for Maleficent’s flames and the pink and blue for Aurora’s gown. In all, during his work on the film, Earle created around three hundred visual development paintings, hundreds of small sequence sketches, and dozens of key background paintings, some of them fifteen feet long. Over eight hundred of other backgrounds used in the film were created by artists such as Thelma Witmer, Frank Armitage, and Walt Peregoy, who worked under Earle's supervision and followed his style to maintain the required consistency in the film's design.

While the layout artists and animators were impressed with Earle's paintings, they also grew depressed at working with a style that many of them regarded as too cold, flat, and modernist for a fairy tale feature. Animators in particular struggled to make their characters, who also had to be stylized to match Earle's style, stand out against his busy and detailed background paintings, with the overall design and color styling having an inhibiting effect on character animation. Frank Thomas complained about this to Ken Peterson, head of the animation department, to which the latter responded by citing Disney's instructions. At one point, a group of animators, including Thomas and Milt Kahl, rebelled and went to Disney's office to complain. Nevertheless, Disney insisted on the visual design, claiming that the inspirational art he had commissioned in the past, such as Mary Blair's, had always been homogenized by the animators. Earle's design also prompted Disney to film Sleeping Beauty in the Super Technirama 70 widescreen process, which caused further difficulties for animators and layout artists who had to work with very large sheets of paper and, therefore, create twice as much art as before to fill the frame.

When Clyde Geronimi became the supervising director, he had creative differences with Earle, feeling that some of the latter's paintings "didn't have the mood… All that beautiful detail in the trees, the bark, and all that, that's all well and good, but who the hell's going to look at that? The backgrounds became more important than the animation. He'd made them more like Christmas cards". By that time, Disney himself, in spite of his initial instructions, felt that too much focus was put on the film's design to the detriment of its story. In March 1958, before Sleeping Beauty was completed, Earle left the Disney studio to take a job at John Sutherland Productions, after which Geronimi had the background paintings softened with an airbrush so that they did not compete with the animation. Nevertheless, Sleeping Beauty was the first time when background paintings had determined the art direction of a Disney film.

Live-action reference 
Before the animation process began, a live-action reference version was filmed with actors in costumes serving as models for the animators, which Disney insisted on because he wanted the characters to appear "as real as possible, near flesh-and-blood". However, Milt Kahl objected to this method, calling it "a crutch, a stifling of the creative effort", also adding that "anyone worth his salt in this business ought to know how people move". 

Helene Stanley, who had previously served as a model for the titular character in Cinderella (1950), provided a live-action reference for Princess Aurora, as well as for some scenes of the good fairies. Her costume for the part of Aurora's woodland disguise, Briar Rose, was created by Alice Estes at the behest of her future husband, Marc Davis, as her first job assignment for the Disney studio. The role of Prince Phillip was modeled by Ed Kemmer. For a few scenes in the final battle sequence, he had to ride a wooden wagon imitating a horse, which was controlled by the animators. Cubby O'Brien, who was a Mouseketeer on The Mickey Mouse Club, served as a model for young Phillip.

The live-action reference for Maleficent was provided by both her voice actress, Eleanor Audley, and dancer Jane Fowler, who also served as a model for Queen Leah.  Among the actresses who performed in reference footage for the Three Good Fairies were Spring Byington, Madge Blake, and Frances Bavier. Hans Conried and Don Barclay, who had previously modeled for Captain Hook and Mr. Smee in Peter Pan (1953), provided a live-action reference for King Stefan and King Hubert. The role of the lackey, who serves wine to the kings in the "Skumps" sequence, was modeled by Franklin Pangborn.

Character animation 
Tom Oreb, whose designs employed the "straight-against-curve" motif, similar to Eyvind Earle's backgrounds, was tasked as the film's character stylist. He was the first Disney artist to receive a sole credit in that capacity. Oreb worked closely with Earle, who also had the decision in the case of character designs and color schemes, and created preliminary sketches for most of the characters, incorporating strong horizontal and vertical planes of the background paintings into their designs. The studio's ink and paint department also made finished cels of Oreb's sketches, which were placed over Earle's backgrounds, to make sure they would match the film's style. Likewise with Earle's styling, the animators complained that Oreb's designs were too rigid to animate. According to Ken Anderson, the characters became "really, unfortunately, quite stiff. In order to fit this mannered background, they, too, took on a sort of cylindrical, geometrical shape that didn't lend itself as well to the… Well, you might say, the Bambi type of animation. It wasn't really possible just to make the characters fit the style and still be quite as attractive."

Marc Davis, who, unlike most of the animators, embraced Earle's style, was assigned as the supervising animator of Princess Aurora. Collaborating with Oreb, he created a "leading lady of elegance", whose earlier designs were influenced by the features of Audrey Hepburn. Stylizing the character to match the backgrounds, Oreb incorporated vertical lines into the folds of her costume and two-dimensional swirls into her hair, while Davis slightly sharpened her features and clothes and added Art Nouveau and Art Deco style into her curls. The final design of Aurora was more refined than those of preceding Disney heroines, and therefore required much more attention to detail than any animated character before. Particularly, Iwao Takamoto, who handled quality control of Aurora's animation, described working with animation drawings as a "laborious job" that limited in-betweeners such as himself to completing only six or seven drawings per day, while one second of the film required twenty-four.

Davis was also tasked with supervising the animation of Maleficent. He takes sole credit for the design of the character, which was influenced by a religious painting from a Czechoslovakian art book that Davis found in his home library. His original designs featured red trim to Maleficent's costume to highlight its flame-like shape, but Earle requested the change to lavender as red would come off too strong, in which Davis agreed to. He also added horns and a collar resembling bat wings to give the character a devil-like look, while her costume was endowed with a reptilian quality to foreshadow the dragon she would transform into at the film's climax. Animating Maleficent proved challenging for Davis due to the character's tendency to soliloquize and lack of physical contact with other characters, which was resolved through the introduction of Diablo, Maleficent's raven, whom Davis also designed and animated. Maleficent's dragon form was animated by Eric Cleworth, who based its head movements on those of a rattlesnake.

Frank Thomas and Ollie Johnston, who struggled the most to adapt to Earle's style, were assigned as the supervising animators of Flora, Fauna, and Merryweather. Disney initially urged for the characters to be homogeneous, like Huey, Dewey, and Louie, which Thomas and Johnston objected to, feeling that it would be more interesting for each fairy to have a distinct personality. Also, Oreb's earlier designs for the characters portrayed them in a strict geometrical style to reflect the three primary shapes (square, triangle, and circle), which proved too difficult to animate, and therefore was discarded. The design was set after Don DaGradi created some preliminary drawings that suggested a "lighter and more delicate" look for the fairies, although they ultimately retained the angularity in their capes and headdresses to match the background styling. For animation of the characters, Thomas and Johnston studied the movements of old ladies, whom they observed at wedding receptions and grocery stores, while the costume design of the fairies was influenced by wardrobe books for medieval Scandinavian and German-style attire.

Milt Kahl, who had previously animated similar characters in Snow White and the Seven Dwarfs (1937) and Cinderella (1950), was tasked with animating Prince Phillip, which he was displeased with due to the character's limited emotional range. He also animated Phillip's horse, Samson, whose design was influenced by the works of Ronald Searle, King Stefan, and King Hubert. Kahl's characters were co-animated by John Lounsbery, who also worked on Aurora's forest animal friends and the pig-like leader of Maleficent's goons. Among other animators working on the film were Wolfgang Reitherman, who directed the climactic dragon battle sequence, Les Clark, who served as the director of the opening scene in which the citizens march to the castle for the christening of Aurora, and John Sibley, who animated the lackey.

Music 
The use of music from Pyotr Tchaikovsky's 1889 The Sleeping Beauty ballet was discussed back in the early stages of the film's development, but the idea was initially discarded due to the potential difficulty of adapting Tchaikovsky's music as a film score. In April 1952, Jack Lawrence and Sammy Fain had signed to write the original songs, while Walter Schumann was assigned as the film's composer. By late summer of that same year, a song score had been identified, which included the main title song and its reprise, written by Fain and Victor Young; the opening number "Holiday", sung by the royal subjects celebrating the birth of Princess Aurora, followed by "It Happens I Have a Picture", in which King Stefan and King Hubert discuss the virtues of their respective children; "Sunbeams (Bestowal of Gifts)", sung by the Three Good Fairies and Maleficent as they bestow their gifts on Aurora; "Where in the World", Aurora's solo, followed by the love song "Once Upon a Dream", in which she meets Prince Phillip; and "Mirage (Follow Your Heart)", in which Aurora is lured to the spinning wheel.

In the following year, after Eyvind Earle was assigned as the film's artistic director, Disney returned to the idea of using Tchaikovsky's ballet score, feeling that Broadway-esque songs Lawrence and Fain had written would not fit in with Earle's stylized design. Schumann attempted to create new arrangements for the songs that would give them a "Tchaikovsky sound", but this proved unsuccessful, rendering the original song score unusable, except for "Once Upon a Dream", which was based on the "Garland Waltz" theme from the ballet. Later, Schumann left the project due to creative differences with Disney, and George Bruns was recommended to replace him by Ward Kimball. Sleeping Beauty was both Bruns' first collaboration with the Disney studio and his first experience as a film composer.

Working closely with animators, directors, and story artists, Bruns spent three years studying and experimenting with Tchaikovsky's music to make it work as a film score. The opening number, "Hail to the Princess Aurora",  sung by the royal subjects heading to the castle to attend Aurora's christening, was based on the march from the ballet's prologue, while the third strain of the "Garland Waltz" was turned into "I Wonder", a song sung by Aurora walking through the forest with her animal friends. For the scene, in which Maleficent lures Aurora to the spinning wheel, Bruns used the "Puss in the Boots" theme due to its "ominous quality that fitted perfectly into the needs of the suspense sequence". He also made several attempts to create a song from the "Silver Fairy" theme, resulting in "Riddle, Diddle, One, Two, Three", sung by Flora, Fauna, and Merryweather as they prepare birthday presents for Aurora. The song was ultimately cut, but its melody remained in the same sequence in the final film. Among other deleted songs were "Evil—Evil", which would have been sung by Maleficent and her goons, and "Go to Sleep", in which the Three Good Fairies put a sleeping spell on the castle.

In all, four of Bruns' songs based on the ballet score were used in the film, including "Hail to the Princess Aurora", "The Gifts of Beauty and Song", "I Wonder", and "Sleeping Beauty". For "Skumps", sung by King Stefan and King Hubert toasting to their children's upcoming wedding, Bruns composed his own tune, adhering to Tchaikovsky's style, since he could not find anything suitable in the ballet. Lyrics for the songs were written by Tom Adair, Erdman Penner, Winston Hibler, and Ted Sears. Most of them have the same placement and purpose in the plot as the original song score by Fain and Lawrence. Recording of the music initially started in the United States, but due to the musicians' strike, Disney sent Bruns to a state-of-the-art studio in Berlin, Germany, which allowed to use a new stereo sound system in the film. Sleeping Beauty'''s musical score was the first true stereo soundtrack. It was recorded with the participation of the Graunke Symphony Orchestra from September 8 through November 25, 1958.

 Release 
 Original theatrical run Sleeping Beauty premiered at the Fox Wilshire Theater in Los Angeles on January 29, 1959, and was simultaneously released to theaters, accompanied by the Academy Award-winning documentary short film Grand Canyon (1958). It was played in selected theaters that were specially equipped to project the film in large-format Super Technirama 70 prints with six-track stereophonic sound. To promote the film, a Disneyland episode "The Peter Tchaikovsky Story" was aired on ABC on January 30, 1959, featuring a loosely adapted biopic of Pyotr Tchaikovsky, Disney's personal explanation of the Super Technirama 70 process, and several clips from Sleeping Beauty. This was the first television show ever presented in a stereo simulcast.

With a production budget of $6 million, Sleeping Beauty was the most expensive Disney film at the time of its release and over twice as expensive as each of the preceding three Disney animated features—Alice in Wonderland (1951), Peter Pan (1953), and Lady and the Tramp (1955). During its original release, the film grossed approximately $5.3 million in theater rentals (the distributor's share of the box office gross) from the United States and Canada, becoming a box-office bomb and resulting Disney's distribution division, Buena Vista Distribution, to ultimately lose $900,000. The film's production costs and box-office failure, coupled with the underperformance of much of the rest of Disney's 1959–1960 release slate, resulted in the company posting its first annual loss in a decade for fiscal year 1960, which amounted to $1,300,000,
as well as in massive lay-offs throughout the animation department.

 Re-releases Sleeping Beauty was first re-released theatrically in 1970 on standard 35 mm film, garnering rentals of $3.8 million. In May 1979, it had a reissue in the original 70 mm format as a ten-week test engagement at the Crest Theatre in Seattle, before going into wider release later that year in both 70 mm and 35 mm prints with stereo and mono sound. The film had further re-releases in 1986, grossing $40 million in the United States and Canada, and in 1995. With a lifetime gross in the United States and Canada of $51.6 million across its original release and reissues, Sleeping Beauty has become the second most successful film released in 1959, second to Ben-Hur (1959).  When adjusted for ticket price inflation, the domestic total gross averages nearly $681 million, placing it within the top 40 of the highest-grossing films.

 Home media 
On October 14, 1986, Sleeping Beauty was released for the first time on home video on VHS, Betamax, and LaserDisc as part of the Walt Disney Classics collection. During the release, over one million copies of video cassettes were sold. It went into moratorium on March 31, 1988. In 1997, the film underwent a digital restoration and was released to both VHS and LaserDisc in fullscreen and widescreen as part of the Walt Disney Masterpiece Collection on September 16. To commemorate the release, Mary Costa, the voice of Princess Aurora, hosted a special theatrical screening of the film in her hometown of Knoxville, Tennessee.Sleeping Beauty was released on VHS and a two-disc Special Edition DVD on September 9, 2003, with the latter including both widescreen, formatted at 2.35:1, and full-screen versions of the film. Among the DVD supplements were a making-of featurette from the 1997 VHS, a documentary film Grand Canyon, a Life of Tchaikovsky segment of the Disneyland episode "The Peter Tchaikovsky Story", a 1951 story outline of the film, live-action reference clips, a virtual gallery of concept art, layout and background designs, three trailers, and an audio commentary of Mary Costa, Eyvind Earle, Ollie Johnston, and others. The release was discontinued on January 31, 2004.

On October 7, 2008, a Platinum Edition of Sleeping Beauty was released as a two-disc DVD and Blu-ray, making it the first installment in the Platinum line to be released in high-definition video. This release was based upon the 2007 restoration of the film from the original Technicolor negatives (interpositives several generations removed from the original negative were used for other home video releases) in its full negative aspect ratio of 2.55:1, which is wider than both prints shown at the film's original Technirama engagements in 2.20:1 and the CinemaScope-compatible reduction prints for general release at 2.35:1. Extras included an online feature BD-Live, an all-new documentary Picture Perfect: The Making of Sleeping Beauty, a virtual recreation of Sleeping Beauty Castle Walkthrough attraction from Disneyland, an alternate opening of the film, four deleted songs, and several bonus features from the previous DVD release. The set returned to the Disney Vault on January 30, 2010.Sleeping Beauty was re-released on a Diamond Edition Blu-ray and DVD, as well Digital HD, on October 7, 2014, featuring a documentary short film Art of Evil: Generations Of Disney Villains, dedicated to animators and the legacy of villains from Disney features, three deleted scenes from the film and karaoke, as well as a number of supplements from the Platinum Blu-ray release. On September 24, 2019, in honor of its 60th anniversary, Sleeping Beauty was re-released on HD digital download and Blu-ray as part of the Walt Disney Signature Collection.

 Lawsuit 
In May 1989, Mary Costa sued the Walt Disney Company for royalties of $2 million owed to her since the 1986 home video release of Sleeping Beauty. She claimed that her contract with the studio prevented them from producing "phonograph recordings or transcriptions for sale to the public" without her permission, although Disney claimed that the video tapes were nothing more than versions of the film. By June 1991, the case was settled out-of-court in favor of Costa for an undisclosed sum.

 Reception 
 Critical response 
Bosley Crowther, writing in his review for The New York Times, complimented that "the colors are rich, the sounds are luscious and magic sparkles spurt charmingly from wands", but criticized its similarity with Snow White and the Seven Dwarfs. He further wrote that "the princess looks so much like Snow White they could be a couple of Miss Rheingolds separated by three or four years. And she has the same magical rapport with the little creatures of the woods. The witch is the same slant-eyed Circe who worked her evil on Snow White. And the three good fairies could be maiden sisters of the misogynistic seven dwarfs." A review in Time magazine harshly wrote that "Even the drawing in Sleeping Beauty is crude: a compromise between sentimental, crayon-book childishness and the sort of cute, commercial cubism that tries to seem daring but is really just square. The hero and heroine are sugar sculpture, and the witch looks like a clumsy tracing from a Charles Addams cartoon. The plot often seems to owe less to the tradition of the fairy tale than to the formula of the monster movie. In the final reel it is not a mere old-fashioned witch the hero has to kill, but the very latest model of The Thing from 40,000 Fathoms." Harrison's Reports wrote: "It is doubtful, however, if adults will find as much satisfaction in Sleeping Beauty as they did in Snow White and the Seven Dwarfs, with which this latest effort will be assuredly compared because both stories are in many respects similar. While Beauty is unquestionably superior from the viewpoint of the art of animation, it lacks comedy characters that can be compared favorably with the unforgettable Seven Dwarfs."

Among more favorable reviews, Variety praised the singing voices of Mary Costa and Bill Shirley and noted that "some of the best parts of the picture are those dealing with the three good fairies, spoken and sung by Verna Felton, Barbara Jo Allen and Barbara Luddy." Kate Cameron, reviewing for The New York Daily News, described the film as "enchanting" and as a "picture that will charm the young and tickle adults, since the old fairy tale has been transferred to the screen by a Disney who kept his tongue in his cheek throughout the film's animation."

Among contemporary reviews, Dave Kehr of The Chicago Reader later wrote that Sleeping Beauty was "the masterpiece of the Disney Studios’ postwar style. The animation has been stripped down, in accordance with economic imperatives, but what the images lose in shading and detail they gain in strength and fluidity...Though other Disney features were done in the wide-screen format, this is the only one that seizes the full dramatic potential of the extended space, most remarkably when the dragon makes its spectacular appearance in the final reel." Charles Solomon, reviewing for the Los Angeles Times, felt the film "represents the culmination of Walt Disney's effort ...to elevate animation to an art form," although he later wrote "lacks the strong story line of the other Disney features. The central romance between Prince Phillip and Princess Aurora isn't very interesting". 

Its consensus states that "This Disney dreamscape contains moments of grandeur, with its lush colors, magical air, [and] one of the most menacing villains in the Disney canon." On Metacritic, the film has a weighted average score of 85 out of 100 based on 12 critics, indicating "universal acclaim".

 Awards and nominations 

The film is recognized by American Film Institute in these lists:
 2003: AFI's 100 Years...100 Heroes & Villains:
 Maleficent – Nominated Villain
 2006: AFI's Greatest Movie Musicals – Nominated
 2008: AFI's 10 Top 10:
 Nominated Animation Film

 Legacy 

Since its original release in 1959, Sleeping Beauty has become one of the most artistically acclaimed animated films ever produced, receiving praise for its artistic direction, background and color styling, and character animation. It is also considered to be one of the most influential Disney features in the animation industry, with animators such as Mike Gabriel and Michael Giaimo citing the film as their inspiration for entering the business. The latter was heavily influenced by the background and color styling of Sleeping Beauty in creating designs for Pocahontas (1995), Frozen (2013), and its sequel, Frozen II (2019). Andreas Deja, Glen Keane, and Russ Edmonds also took inspiration from the design and animation of the film for their respective characters in Aladdin (1992), Pocahontas (1995), and The Hunchback of Notre Dame (1996). In 2019, the film was selected for preservation in the United States National Film Registry by the Library of Congress as being "culturally, historically, or aesthetically significant".

In 1955, while the film was still in production, Sleeping Beauty Castle was opened at Disneyland, serving both as a symbol of the park and a promotional tool for the film. In 1957, Walt Disney and Shirley Temple opened an indoor walkthrough exhibit featuring a series of dioramas depicting the story of Sleeping Beauty, designed by Eyvind Earle and Ken Anderson. In 1977, the walkthrough was redesigned, replacing the original hand-painted displays with three dimensional sets and doll-like figurines, but in 2001 it was closed due to declining visitors, although the September 11th attacks are also believed to be a major factor behind the closure of the attraction. Seven years later, the exhibit space underwent extensive period refurbishment to recreate the original 1957 dioramas, and reopened to guests in 2008. The film's characters, particularly, Princess Aurora and Maleficent, make regular appearances in the parks and parades, with the latter appearing as one of the villains in the nighttime show Fantasmic! at Disneyland and Disney's Hollywood Studios.

Opened in 1992, Le Château de la Belle au Bois Dormant at Disneyland Paris is a variant of Sleeping Beauty Castle, featuring a gallery of displays that illustrate the story of Sleeping Beauty in tapestries, stained-glass windows and figures. The building also contains an animatronic version of Maleficent's dragon form, which is located in the lower level dungeon, La Tanière du Dragon. In 2005, Hong Kong Disneyland was opened, also with a Sleeping Beauty Castle, nearly replicating Disneyland's original design, but in 2018 the castle was closed and redesigned as Castle of Magical Dreams, reopened in 2020.

In 2007, DisneyToon Studios released a direct-to-video animated film Disney Princess Enchanted Tales: Follow Your Dreams, which featured the first all-new story with most of Sleeping Beauty characters, although it was not a full-feature sequel to the original film. 
Many of the film's characters make cameo appearances in House of Mouse, The Lion King 1½, and Who Framed Roger Rabbit. Flora, Fauna, and Merryweather are featured as recurring characters in Disney Junior series Sofia the First, while Aurora also makes a guest appearance in its episode "Holiday in Enchancia". Along with other Disney Princesses, Aurora appears in the 2018 film Ralph Breaks the Internet.

In 2014, a live-action adaptation of the film, titled Maleficent, was released, which portrays the story from the perspective of the eponymous antagonist, portrayed by Angelina Jolie. It was followed by a sequel, Maleficent: Mistress of Evil, in 2019. Live-action versions of Sleeping Beauty characters are featured in the fantasy television series Once Upon a Time, produced by Disney-owned ABC Studios, including Maleficent, Aurora, Prince Phillip, and King Stefan. Maleficent appears as one of the main villains in 2015 television film Descendants, which follows the teenage children of Disney's iconic heroes and villains, including Maleficent's daughter, Mal, and daughter of Aurora and Phillip, Audrey.

Maleficent is featured as a recurring villain in the Square Enix/Disney Kingdom Hearts video game series, while Aurora also makes an appearance as one of the Princesses of Heart. A world based on the film Enchanted Dominion appears in Kingdom Hearts Birth by Sleep. Aurora, Phillip, and the Three Good Fairies are featured as playable characters in the world builder video game Disney Magic Kingdoms, with Maleficent serving as its main antagonist.

A retrospective exhibition Awaking Beauty: The Art of Eyvind Earle took place at the Walt Disney Family Museum from May 18, 2017 to January 8, 2018. Featuring over 250 works, such as thumbnails paintings, concept artworks, and commercial illustrations, the event reflected on Eyvind Earle's biography and his work at the Walt Disney Studios, including his contribution to Sleeping Beauty''. An accompanying exhibition catalog with the same title was published by Weldon Owen on August 8, 2017.

See also 

 1959 in film
 List of American films of 1959
 List of animated feature films of the 1950s
 List of Walt Disney Pictures films
 List of Disney theatrical animated features
 List of Disney animated films based on fairy tales
 Medieval fantasy

Notes

References

Bibliography

External links 

 
 
 
 
 
 
 

Sleeping Beauty (1959 film)
1959 animated films
1959 films
1950s American animated films
1950s musical fantasy films
1950s English-language films
American children's animated adventure films
American children's animated fantasy films
American children's animated musical films
American fantasy adventure films
American musical fantasy films
American romantic fantasy films
American animated feature films
Animated coming-of-age films
Animated romance films
Films about birthdays
Films about curses
Films about fairies and sprites
Films about princesses
Films about royalty
Films about shapeshifting
Films based on Sleeping Beauty
Films based on multiple works
Films directed by Les Clark
Films directed by Clyde Geronimi
Films directed by Eric Larson
Films directed by Wolfgang Reitherman
Films produced by Walt Disney
Films scored by George Bruns
Films set in castles
Films set in forests
Films set in the 14th century
Films set in the Middle Ages
Rotoscoped films
American sword and sorcery films
Walt Disney Animation Studios films
Walt Disney Pictures animated films
Animated films about dragons
United States National Film Registry films
1959 directorial debut films
Disney Princess films